Bankivia fasciata, common name the banded kelp shell, is a species of sea snail, a marine gastropod mollusk in the family Trochidae, the top snails.

Description
The length of the shell varies between 15 mm and 25 mm. The thin, imperforate, elongated shell has a turreted shape. This is a variable species in size and coloration. It is polished and shining, white, creamy or pink, with spiral bands of pink, purplish-red or purplish-brown, or narrow oblique zigzag stripes of pinkish-brown, usually with a narrow subsutural fascia of dark or pinkish. The spire is elevated and slender. The dark apex is a little blunt. The about 9 whorls are, very slightly convex, and a trifle impressed below the sutures. The surface (under a lens) is very densely, finely spirally striate. The body whorl is  rounded. The base of the shell shows a few concentric, separated, impressed lines. The aperture is ovate. The thin outer lipis acute. The sinuous columella is arcuate above and narrowly reflexed, obliquely truncate below.

Distribution
This marine species occurs in the Gulf of Aqaba, off Mozambique and off New South Wales to South Australia, and off Tasmania

References

 Pritchard, G.B. & Gatliff, J.H., 1902. Catalogue of the Marine Shells of Victoria. Part V. Proc. R. Soc. Vict.n.s., 14(2):85-138
 Shirley, J., 1911. Additions to the Marine Mollusca of Queensland. Proc. R. Soc. Qld, XXIII(1):96-96
 Cotton, B.C. (1959). South Australian Mollusca. Archaeogastropoda. Adelaide : Govt. Printer.
 Iredale, T. & McMichael, D.F., 1962 [31/Dec/1962]. A reference list of the marine Mollusca of New South Wales. Mem. Aust. Mus., 11:0-0
 Macpherson, J.H. & Gabriel, C.J., 1962. Marine Mollusca of Victoria. Melbourne Univ. Press, Melbourne. 475
 Barash, A., Danin, Z. & Yaron, I. (1980). Bankivia fasciata (Menke, 1830) in the Gulf of Aquaba . Bolletino Malacologico. 16 (1-2)
 Wilson, B., 1993. Australian Marine Shells. Prosobranch Gastropods. Odyssey Publishing, Kallaroo, WA

External links
 To Biodiversity Heritage Library (11 publications)
 To Encyclopedia of Life
 To USNM Invertebrate Zoology Mollusca Collection
 To USNM Invertebrate Zoology Mollusca Collection
 To World Register of Marine Species
 

fasciata
Gastropods described in 1830